Osman Yüce (21 April 1929 – 26 January 1965) was a Turkish alpine skier. He competed at the 1948, 1956 and the 1964 Winter Olympics.

References

1929 births
1965 deaths
Turkish male alpine skiers
Olympic alpine skiers of Turkey
Alpine skiers at the 1948 Winter Olympics
Alpine skiers at the 1956 Winter Olympics
Alpine skiers at the 1964 Winter Olympics
People from Sarıkamış
20th-century Turkish people